In chemistry, a mixed oxide is a somewhat informal name for an oxide that contains cations of more than one chemical element or cations of a single element in several states of oxidation.

The term is usually applied to solid ionic compounds that contain the oxide anion  and two or more element cations. Other notable examples include red lead , the ferrites, and the yttrium aluminum garnet , used in lasers. 

The term is sometimes also applied to compounds of oxygen and two or more other elements, where some or all of the oxygen atoms are covalently bound into oxyanions. In sodium zincate , for example, the oxygens are bound to the zinc atoms forming zincate anions. (On the other hand, strontium titanate , despite its name, contains  cations and not the  anion.)

Sometimes the term is applied loosely to solid solutions of metal oxides rather than chemical compounds, or to fine mixtures of two or more oxides.

Mixed oxide minerals are plentiful in nature. Synthetic mixed oxides are components of many ceramics with remarkable properties and important advanced technological applications, such as strong magnets, fine optics, lasers, semiconductors, piezoelectrics, superconductors, catalysts, refractories, gas mantles,  nuclear fuels, and more. Piezoelectric mixed oxides, in particular, are extensively used in pressure and strain gauges, microphones, ultrasound transducers, micromanipulators, delay lines, etc..

See also
 Complex oxide
 Double salt
 MOX fuel

References